Mayo University Hospital is a general hospital in Castlebar, County Mayo, Ireland. It is managed by Saolta University Health Care Group.

History
The hospital has its origins in the Mayo County Hospital which was built on Westport Road in Castlebar and opened in October 1938. This facility developed into Mayo General Hospital. Taoiseach Enda Kenny opened a new Renal Dialysis Unit in December 2013. The hospital changed its name from Mayo General Hospital to Mayo University Hospital in November 2015.

Notable patients
Notable patients have included:

Sir Ernst Boris Chain, died in the hospital on 12 August 1979. He was a German-born British biochemist, and a 1945 co-recipient of the Nobel Prize for Physiology or Medicine for his work on penicillin.
Eithne Kenny, mother of former Taoiseach Enda Kenny and wife of Henry Kenny, died there at the age of 93 on 26 November 2011.
Actor Robert Shaw, died there on 28 August 1978 after suffering a heart attack at the side of the road in Tourmakeady, near the hospital.

References

External links

Health Service Executive hospitals
1938 establishments in Ireland
Hospitals established in 1938
Hospital buildings completed in 1938
Hospitals in County Mayo